Jack Carmichael (born 11 November 1948) is an English former professional footballer who played as a central defender. Active in Scotland, England and the United States, Carmichael made over 400 career league appearances.

Career
Born in Newcastle upon Tyne, Carmichael moved from Scottish junior side Possilpark to English giants Arsenal in 1966. Carmichael never made a league appearance for Arsenal, and later played for Peterborough United and Swindon Town in the Football League, and for the New England Tea Men and the Jacksonville Tea Men in the North American Soccer League.

External links

NASL career stats

1948 births
Living people
English footballers
Arsenal F.C. players
Peterborough United F.C. players
Swindon Town F.C. players
New England Tea Men players
Jacksonville Tea Men players
English Football League players
North American Soccer League (1968–1984) players
North American Soccer League (1968–1984) indoor players
Association football central defenders
English expatriate sportspeople in the United States
Expatriate soccer players in the United States
English expatriate footballers